Breaking Up Gray Skies is the debut studio album from singer Zayra Alvarez.  Her surname does not appear on the cover for the release.

Track listing
 "So Long"
 "Rainy Days"
 "Tonight"
 "Perfect"
 "Slip Away"
 "Anything"

2002 debut albums
Zayra Alvarez albums